The Walgett railway line is a railway line in north-western New South Wales, Australia. Opening in 1908, it branches from the North-West Line at Narrabri and passes through the towns of Wee Waa and Burren before ending in the town of Walgett. The line is used for wheat haulage, and the section between the Walgett wheat terminal and Walgett station is closed. There was a proposal to connect the Gwabegar line to the Walgett line at Burren Junction in 1913, and although approved, this connection was never constructed.

See also
Rail transport in New South Wales
Rail rollingstock in New South Wales

References

Regional railway lines in New South Wales
Standard gauge railways in Australia
Railway lines opened in 1908
1908 establishments in Australia